Martial Arts of Shaolin (lit. "Southern and Northern Shaolin"), also known as Shaolin Temple 3: Martial Arts of Shaolin, is a 1986 Hong Kong–Chinese martial arts film. It is notable as the only collaboration between film director Lau Kar-leung and actor Jet Li. The film was later released on Region 1 DVD by The Weinstein Company under the Dragon Dynasty imprint.

Plot
Set during the Qing dynasty of China, a young monk, Lin Zhi-Ming, trains to be one of the Northern Shaolin school's best fighters, whose skills impresses his elders and classmates. Zhi-Ming is revealed to have been orphaned at a young age and was raised by the temple, with only a silver ankle bracelet being the only reminder of his past life; Zhi-Ming continues to wear this band during his years of training but in secrecy from the temple's elders. Although being a devout student of Shaolin, Zhi-ming has the tendency to break many of the monastery's rules, such as sneaking in meat to temple grounds or teaching the school's secrets to outsiders. On one such occasion of the latter, Zhi-Ming meets some of the local youth, the same who he has unofficially accepted as his disciples; but in a meeting, two of the youths reveal to have been chosen to perform Lion dancing at the birthday of the tyrannical magistrate He Suo, who was responsible for the deaths of Zhi-ming's family. Determined to get his revenge, Zhi-ming persuades the youth to let him perform the Lion dancing instead.

Meanwhile, in Southern China, Si-ma Yan, the niece of the Southern Shaolin school's master Fa Ren, was informed about He Suo's birthday celebrations at the capital and decides to embark on a journey to avenge her family's death by assassinating the magistrate. Master Fa Ren soon discovers Si-ma Yan's disappearance and enlists disciple Chao Wei, a close friend of Si-ma Yan, to aid her during her mission at the capital.

In Lord He Suo's birthday, the festivities go as he had planned. But as Zhi-Ming attempts to perform his Lion dance while planning to stab He Suo, he is interrupted by Si-ma Yan and her compatriots, who attempt to assassinate He Suo with hidden bows during a performance. The plan goes awry after He Suo dodges the arrows and a massive fight ensues, with Zhi-Ming, Si-ma Yan and Chao Wei all escaping He Suo's henchmen. Although Si-ma Yan is wounded in the escape attempt, she and Chao Wei reluctantly agree to work with Zhi-Ming in order to escape He Suo's wrath, who has in the meantime blocked all roads leading to the South, where Si-ma Yan and Chao Wei hope to escape back to Southern Shaolin. The trio eventually bypass checkpoints set up by He Suo's men, but after spending a night to rest from the journey, Si-ma Yan reveals to Zhi-Ming a silver ankle band similar to his. She was told in the past that another person is also in possession of the same exact band and explains that if the band was given to a girl, they would be sisters; but if given to a boy, she was to be arranged to marriage to that boy. Zhi-ming is ecstatic but he does not reveal the band, as the trio are discovered by Zhi-ming's master, Shi Ren, who has searched for Zhi-Ming for deserting Northern Shaolin. Chao Wei and Si-ma Yan agree to flee themselves, but Zhi-ming is bought before the abbot of Northern Shaolin to face punishment, where he is sentenced to 3 years in solitary confinement along with another Shaolin Monk facing 9 years. After Zhi-Ming tells the monk about Si-ma Yan, he is suggested to leave the temple and adopt a secular life but Zhi-Ming admits that Shaolin was all he grew up with and does not wish to do so. After realizing that he cannot dedicate himself to Si-ma Yan, Zhi-Ming expresses his wishes to briefly leave Shaolin to speak to her. The monk decides to help Zhi-Ming by letting him escape under the condition that he returns to face the rest of his punishment.

After reaching Southern Shaolin, Zhi-ming reveals to Chao Wei that he has the same ankle band as Si-ma Yan. But before the two can find her, Si-ma Yan has already left the temple with her uncle to prevent the Southern school from being endangered by He Suo. After narrowly escaping Master Shi Ren again, who arrived for an escort mission from the Abbot, Zhi-Ming and Chao Wei make way for the main road, only to eventually discover Fa Ren mortally wounded and informing the pair that Si-ma Yan was captured by He Suo and taken by boat. Meanwhile, He Suo reveals to Si-ma Yan that plans to lure both Zhi-ming and Chao Wei so that he can personally kill all three by his hands. After discovering He Suo's boat, Zhi-ming and Chao Wei blockade the river and fight He Suo's henchmen, before both Northern and Southern Shaolin temples arrive to assist the duo in saving Si-ma Yan. After his henchmen have been disposed, He Suo is overpowered by Zhi-ming and his companions and is later killed by Si-ma Yan.

With their mission complete, Zhi-ming now returns to Northern Shaolin, but not without giving Chao Wei the ankle bracelet. Although he opposes at first, Chao Wei is then seen holding the bracelet by Si-ma Yan and claims that the bracelet belongs to him, which Zhi-ming expresses his well wishes before departing with the monks back to Northern Shaolin.

Production
The film is the third part of the successful Shaolin film series which began with the 1982 film, Shaolin Temple, and was followed by Kids From Shaolin (1984). However, although it stars many Mainland actors from either or both predecessor films (Jet Li, Yu Chenghui, Yu Hai, Hu Jianqiang and Huang Qiuyan), Martial Arts Of Shaolin uses a Hong Kong production crew from Shaw Brothers Studio, in contrast to the other two films (which are Hong Kong-funded but are shot by a Mainland director with a Mainland crew).

Cast
 Jet Li as Lin Zhi-ming
 Huang Qiuyan as Si-ma Yan
 Hu Jianqiang as Chao Wei
 Yu Chenghui as Lord He Suo
 Yu Hai as Master Shi Ren
 Sun Jian-kui as Lord He's bodyguard
 Lau Wai-leung as Lord He's bodyguard
 Ji Chunhua as Lord He's bodyguard
 Mak Wai-cheung as Wei Fang
 Yan Di-hua as Master Wu Lou
 Zhang Jian-wen as Head Abbot
 Hung Yan-yan as Shaolin student

Box office
In Hong Kong, the film grossed 18,106,589, making it the sixth top-grossing film of the year. It performed moderately well at the Hong Kong box office.

In China, it became the highest-grossing film of 1987, selling  tickets in the country. In South Korea, the film sold 164,230 tickets in the capital city of Seoul, adding up to 116,164,230 tickets sold in China and South Korea.

Accolades

References

External links
 Martial Arts Of Shaolin at Hong Kong Cinemagic
 
 
 

Chinese action comedy films
Chinese martial arts comedy films
1986 films
1986 action films
1986 martial arts films
Hong Kong action films
Hong Kong action comedy films
Hong Kong martial arts films
Hong Kong martial arts comedy films
Hong Kong sequel films
Kung fu films
Wushu films
1980s Cantonese-language films
1980s Mandarin-language films
Shaw Brothers Studio films
Films directed by Lau Kar-leung
Shaolin Temple in film
1980s Hong Kong films